HD 159176, also known as Boss 4444 and V1036 Scorpii,  is a variable star about 2,800 light years from the Earth, in the constellation Scorpius. It is a 5th magnitude star, so it should be visible to the naked eye of an observer far from city lights. HD 159176 is the brightest star in the young open cluster NGC 6383. It is a binary star composed of two nearly identical O stars in a circular orbit.

In 1930, Robert Trumpler discovered that HD 159176 is a spectroscopic binary. He noted that the two stars have very nearly the same brightness and spectral type. In addition, he was observing at the Lick Observatory, so the far southern declination of the star meant it could only be observed near transit.   Those three things together prevented him from unambiguously measuring the orbital period. The first full set of orbital elements, including the  day period, was derived by Peter Conti et al. in 1975. Also in 1975, photometric observations by J. C. Thomas showed that HD 159176 is a rotating ellipsoidal variable. The star's spectra exhibit the Struve–Sahade effect.  HD 159176 was given the variable star designation V1036 Scorpii, in 1997.

Although HD 159176 was long considered to be a non-eclipsing binary, data from the Transiting Exoplanet Survey Satellite does show eclipses.

HD 159176 has an X-ray luminosity far higher than would be expected from two isolated O stars. The excess X-rays may arise from interacting  stellar winds.

References

Scorpius (constellation)
86011
159176
Scorpii, V1036
6535
Rotating ellipsoidal variables